The European Qualifiers for men's football competitions at the 1988 Summer Olympics to be held in Seoul. The tournament took place from 10 September 1986 to 31 May 1988 including a preliminary round. At the end, five countries qualified including West Germany, Italy, Sweden, Soviet Union, and Yugoslavia.

The draw for the tournament took place soon after the 1986 FIFA World Cup in Mexico. Out of 34 European football nations at the time in tournament participated only 27 with five allowing for qualification to the Summer Olympics football tournament. All participants were split in five groups of five teams with winners of each qualify for the Olympics. Four teams were contesting two berths in two of five groups.

Seven football nations that did not participate included four team of British islands (England, Northern Ireland, Scotland, Wales) that refused to form the unified Great Britain team required by the International Olympic Committee (IOC), Malta (never fielded its team previously), Luxembourg (not fielding in 1980s), and Albania (political restrictions since 1972).

For the tournament returned Turkey and Warsaw Pact nations that boycotted the 1984 Olympics football tournament in Los Angeles such as East Germany, Poland and the Soviet Union.

Group A

Preliminary play-off

|}

Group stage

Group B

Group C

Group D

Preliminary play-off

|}

Group stage

Group E

Notes

References

External links 
Games of the XXIV. Olympiad – European Football Qualifying Tournament (Seoul, South Korea, 1988) – Rec.Sport.Soccer Statistics Foundation

Football qualification for the 1988 Summer Olympics
Football at the Summer Olympics – Men's European Qualifiers